Jacob Moverare (born August 31, 1998) is a Swedish professional ice hockey defenceman. He is currently playing with the Ontario Reign in the American Hockey League (AHL) as a prospect under contract with the Los Angeles Kings of the National Hockey League (NHL). He was selected by the Kings in the fourth round, 112th overall, in the 2016 NHL Entry Draft.

Playing career

Moverare made his Swedish Hockey League debut with HV71 during the 2015–16 SHL season, going scoreless in 4 games. He was promoted to the SHL after posting 21 points in 41 games from the blueline for HV71 at the J20 SuperElit level.

On June 25, 2016, Moverare was selected 112th overall by the Los Angeles Kings in the 2016 NHL Entry Draft. He was soon signed to a three-year, entry-level contract with the Kings on July 15, 2016. Signalling his intentions to continue his development in North America, Moverare was selected 20th overall in the 2016 CHL Import Draft by the Mississauga Steelheads of the Ontario Hockey League (OHL), agreeing to terms on August 9, 2016.

Following two seasons of major junior hockey with the Steelheads, Moverare embarking on his first full professional season attended the Kings 2018 training camp. On September 23, 2018, Moverare was cut from the roster and initially reassigned to join the training camp of American Hockey League (AHL) affiliate, the Ontario Reign. With a surplus of defenseman within the Kings organization and with the interest of guaranteed icetime, Moverare was loaned by the Kings back to the SHL, to continue his development. Opting to not return to HV71, Moverare secured a season long agreement with Frölunda HC for the 2018–19 season on September 24, 2018.

Career statistics

Regular season and playoffs

International

Awards and honours

References

External links

1998 births
Frölunda HC players
HV71 players
Living people
Los Angeles Kings draft picks
Los Angeles Kings players
Mississauga Steelheads players
Ontario Reign (AHL) players
People from Östersund
SaiPa players
Swedish ice hockey defencemen
Swedish expatriates in Canada
Sportspeople from Jämtland County